The 153rd Rifle Division was a Soviet infantry division of the Red Army during World War II. It was formed in the Ural Military District. On 22 June 1941 when the German Operation Barbarossa began, it was serving under command of Nikolai Gagen with the 51st Rifle Corps of the 22nd Army. By 29 June 1941, after the effective destruction of the 37th Rifle Division, a composite regiment (20th Rifle Regiment) formed mostly from 37th Rifle Division rear units (Tyl) was attached to the division.

The 153rd Rifle Division was one of the first divisions to be designated a Guards formation, becoming 3rd Guards Rifle Division on 18 September 1941, due to 'its combat record in Belarus and Smolensk'. It was reformed for the second time in February 1942, and later became the 57th Guards Rifle Division in December 1942, after fighting with the 63rd Army.

Reformed for the third time, during the East Prussian Offensive, on 6 April 1945 the Division, which was with the 69th Rifle Corps, 50th Army, was one of the divisions in the encirclement around Königsberg, located at the northwest sector. The division to the right was the 216th Rifle Division, and to the left was the 110th Rifle Division. They attacked German positions and broke through the second defense line.

References

External links
153-я стрелковая дивизия (Russian)

153